La Cité des Jeunes A.-M.-Sormany is a Francophone high school in Edmundston, New Brunswick, Canada.  It was named after Dr. Albert M. Sormany.

Attendance

La Cité des Jeunes A.-M.-Sormany has over a thousand students attending. According to the 2006-2007 student census, precisely 1349 students attend this institution. Grade 9, 10, 11 and 12 are admitted including handicapped students.

Curriculum

The standard curriculum of the institution is divided in the following departments:
Arts (Music and visual arts) and Language (French, English and Spanish)
Mathematics and Science (Biology, Chemistry and  Physics)
Home Economics
Human Sciences
Physical Education
Technology

Its optional classes curriculum is one of the most varied in the province of New Brunswick with optional classes available in all aforementioned subjects. This includes such subjects as drama, sewing, dance and astronomy.

"La Chaîne Humaine"

La Cité des Jeunes A.-M.-Sormany is renowned for its annual community food and fund raising for the local food bank ("R.A.D.O.") in Edmundston. The students gather over a hundred thousand food items (as well as other household items) every year. This event is organised by the school's humanitarian committee operated by teachers and students.

Mascot
The high school has a school mascot named Cidji.
The name was coined by a student during a name-the-mascot contest.

Theme Song
The Cité des Jeunes have a theme song that was written by Étienne Deschênes, À moi la vie

See also
List of schools in New Brunswick
Edmundston
Madawaska County

References

External links
  Cité des Jeunes A.-M.-Sormany Official Website (In French)

High schools in New Brunswick
Educational institutions established in 1972
Education in Edmundston